Durdana Butt (9 May 1938 – 12 August 2021) was a Pakistani actress known for her roles in dramas Ruswai, Intezaar and Rani. She was best known for her role in dramas Tanhaiyaan and Tanhaiyan Naye Silsilay as Bibi.

Early life
Durdana was born in Lahore, Punjab on 9 May 1938. She studied at Kinnaird College and later went to the University of Toledo, where she achieved a PhD in Ohio educational administration.

Career
She then went on to pursue acting where she worked in commercials and modeling, which she did briefly on PTV Channel. She started working in theater when a director gave her a role in a comedy drama. She accepted the role and she was praised for her natural acting and expressions. Soon after that she performed in many dramas on PTV Channel. In 1978 she had a role in the drama Fifty Fifty with Moin Akhtar. The drama finished in 1984; she had become well known among the audience. In 1980 she had the role of Sultana Sahiba in the drama Aangan Terha an emotional role for which she was praised. She was paired again with Moin Akhter in a comedy drama Naukar Ke Aage Chakar in 1982. In 1985 she was offered a role in the drama Tanhaiyaan which she accepted, appearing with Marina Khan, Shehnaz Sheikh and Badar Khalil. She had the role of Bibi, who is a mother figure to the main protagonists who lose their parents in an accident. The drama was successful and she along with other cast members, was recognized for her talent.

Personal life
Durdana was married to her cousin, who died during the 1970s.

Illness and death
Durdana Butt was on a ventilator for twelve days at a hospital in Karachi before she died from COVID-19 complications on 12 August 2021.

Filmography

Television

Telefilm

Film

Tribute and honour
The Arts Council of Pakistan Karachi held a tribute in her memory. Theatre artist and writer Kulsoom Aftab described her a person who brought smiles to people's faces and in the ceremony Imran Shirvanee, Misbah Khalid, and Zaheer Khan were present to acknowledge her contribution to Pakistani dramas for four decades. The Government of Pakistan named a street and intersection after her in Lahore on August 16, 2021.

Awards and recognition

References

External links
 

1938 births
20th-century Pakistani actresses
Recipients of Sitara-i-Imtiaz
21st-century Pakistani actresses
Actresses from Lahore
2021 deaths
Pakistani film actresses
Pakistani television actresses
PTV Award winners
Punjabi people
Recipients of the Pride of Performance